"Mama's Rockin' Chair" is a song recorded by the American country music artist John Conlee. It was released in July 1987 as the second single from the album American Faces. The song reached #11 on the Billboard Hot Country Singles & Tracks chart. The song was written by Tim Mensy and Johnny MacRae.

Chart performance

References

1987 singles
1987 songs
John Conlee songs
Songs written by Johnny MacRae
Songs written by Tim Menzies
Columbia Records singles